Zay Zay Htet (born 1983) is a painter from Myanmar. He is well known for his political and social statements in his ‘To Day Light’ series, where he paints images of closed doors with open padlocks.

Zay was born in 1983 in Yangon, Myanmar. He studied Under artist U Tun Tun Zaw, U Tin Tun Hlaing, and U Aung Naing.

References

External links
Zay Zay Htut

Living people
1983 births
Burmese painters
Burmese performance artists
Date of birth missing (living people)